Oli Ahad ( – 20 October 2012) was a Bangladeshi politician and language activist of the Language Movement. He was awarded Independence Day Award in 2004 by the Government of Bangladesh.

Early life
Ahad was born in the Islampur village of Brahmanbaria District in 1928. In 1944, he graduated from Daudkandi Government Aided High School. During the election for the referendum of Pakistan, he became involved in politics and campaigned at places like Tripura and Bogra, and was arrested a number of times. Barrister Rumeen Farhana is his daughter.

Career
Ahad was one of the founders of East Pakistan Muslim Chhatra League formed on 4 Jan 1948. He was the founding general secretary of the Ganatantrik Juba League. He joined the National Awami Party (NAP) through the Kagmari Convention in 1957.

Involvement in language movement
Ahad first met with Khawaja Nazimuddin to discuss his language proposal on 8 January 1948. Later that year, he became a member of the committee that organised a Hartal on 12 March, demanding Bangla be made the official state language. Prior to that, he was also nominated as a member of the Muslim Chhatra League. While picketing in front of the Secretariat, he was attacked and arrested along with Sheikh Mujibur Rahman, Khaleque Nawaz Khan, and Shamsul Haque.

In 1949, Ahad and three other students were expelled from the university. Ahad was present at the historical meeting that took place at the Amtala of Dhaka University on 21 February 1952. Later that day, he organized the agitated students. The next day he led a rally and called for a nationwide Hartal.

Other activities
Ahad served as the editor of the weekly publication Ittehad. He was also the chairman of a political party named Democratic League. He wrote a book named Jatiyo Rajneeti 1945 Theke 1975 (National Politics: 1945 To 1975).

Illness and death
Ahad had been ill and in hospital during March–April, 2012, returning home after his condition improved. He was again admitted to Samarita Hospital in Dhaka on 14 October with a lung infection, ultimately resulting in his death on 20 October 2012.

Family
Ahad was married to Rashida Begum, an academic. They had a daughter Barrister Rumeen Farhana.

Legacy
Dhaka City Corporation renamed Dhanmondi Road No. 4 after him as of 27 February 2007.

References
The content of this article is based on its Bangla equivalent on bangla Wikipedia.

1920s births
2012 deaths
People from Brahmanbaria district
Bangladeshi politicians
Recipients of the Independence Day Award
Burials at Banani Graveyard
Infectious disease deaths in Bangladesh